The Sikorsky S-69 (military designation XH-59) is an American experimental co-axial compound helicopter developed by Sikorsky Aircraft as the demonstrator of the Advancing Blade Concept (ABC) under United States Army and NASA funding.

Development
In late 1971, the Army Air Mobility Research and Development Laboratory, which later became a part of the Army Research Laboratory, awarded Sikorsky a contract for the development of the first prototype. The S-69 was the demonstrator for the Advancing Blade Concept (ABC).

The first S-69 built (73-21941) first flew on July 26, 1973. However, it was badly damaged in a low-speed crash on August 24, 1973 due to unexpected rotor forces and insufficient control systems. The airframe was then converted into a wind tunnel testbed, which was tested in the NASA Ames Research Center 40x80 feet full-scale wind tunnel in 1979. A second airframe was completed (73-21942) which first flew on July 21, 1975. After initial testing as a pure helicopter, two auxiliary turbojets were added in March 1977. At  level flight, it could enter a 1.4 g bank turn with the rotor in autorotation, increasing rotor rpm. Airframe stress prevented rotor speed reduction and thus full flight envelope expansion. The XH-59A had high levels of vibration and fuel consumption.

The 106-hour test program for the XH-59A ended in 1981. In 1982 it was proposed that the XH-59A be converted to the XH-59B configuration with advanced rotors, new powerplants (two GE T700s), and a ducted pusher propeller at the tail. This proposed program did not proceed as Sikorsky refused to pay a share of the costs. Sikorsky and its partners funded the development of the next helicopters using the Advancing Blade Concept, the Sikorsky X2 and Sikorsky S-97 Raider, from 2007.

Design

The Advancing Blade Concept system consisted of two rigid, contra-rotating rotors (30 inches apart) which made use of the aerodynamic lift of the advancing blades. At high speeds, the retreating blades were offloaded, as most of the load was supported by the advancing blades of both rotors and the penalty due to stall of the retreating blade was thus eliminated. This system did not require a wing to be fitted for high speeds and to improve maneuverability, and also eliminated the need for an anti-torque rotor at the tail. Forward thrust was provided by two turbojets, which allowed the main rotor to only be required to provide lift. It was found to have good hover stability against crosswind and tailwind. With jets installed, it lacked power to hover out of ground effect and used short take-off and landing for safety reasons.

Surviving aircraft
Airframe 73-21941 is in storage at the NASA Ames Research Center and 73-21942 is on display at the Army Aviation Museum, Fort Rucker, Alabama.

Specifications (S-69)

See also

References

External links

 Global Security.org Sikorsky XH-59 page
 Sikorsky X2
 "X2 marks the spot for radical rotor designs" FlightGlobal
 Leoni, Ray. The High Speed Helicopter – A New Beginning (Sikorsky)

Coaxial rotor helicopters
United States military helicopters
1970s United States experimental aircraft
1970s United States helicopters
Experimental helicopters
S-069
Twin-turbine helicopters
Twinjets
Jet-propelled helicopters
Aircraft first flown in 1973